SS President Jackson may refer to:

 , a Design 1029 ship originally launched as SS Silver State; renamed President Jackson in 1923; became United States Navy transport USS Zeilin (AP-9/APA-3) during World War II; scrapped in 1948
 ; served as USNS Barrett (T-AP-196) during the Korean and Vietnam Wars; renamed TS Empire State V as a training ship for State University of New York Maritime College (1973–1990); scrapped in 2007

Ship names